Tivy High School is a public high school located in Kerrville, Texas, United States. It is classified as a 5A school by the UIL, and is a part of the Kerrville Independent School District located in east central Kerr County.   In 2015, the school was rated "Met Standard" by the Texas Education Agency.

Athletics
Tivy competes in these sports - 

Volleyball, Cross Country, Football, Basketball, Soccer, Golf, Tennis, Track, Baseball & Softball

State titles
Boys Basketball  - 
1969(3A), 1970(3A)
Girls Golf - 
1980(3A), 1981(3A)

State Finalist
Girls Basketball  - 
2006(4A)
Football  - 
1936(3A)

Band 
The marching season for the Tivy High School Band begins when school starts and end after Area/State UIL contest, which is before the end of the 1st semester. During the 2nd semester, marching band students transition to concert band.

Tivy High School Marching Band 
The Tivy HS Marching Band participates in UIL Marching Contest every year. UIL Area and State Contest are held in alternate years to keep down the cost. Tivy HS Marching Band falls under 5A, which is measured by the student enrollment to the school and is located in Area H.

Concert Band 
Concert Band consist of Symphonic Band and Wind Ensemble. The Wind Ensemble usually plays grade 4-5 music, and the Symphonic Band plays grade 2-3 and sometimes grade 4 music.

Academics 
UIL Boys Team Debate Champions 
1965(3A)
UIL Accounting Team Champions 
2022(5A)

Theater
One Act Play 
2000(4A)

Notable alumni
 Chester W. Nimitz, Commander in Chief, Pacific Fleet (CINCPAC) during World War II.
 Mike Dyal, former football tight end for the Los Angeles Raiders, Kansas City Chiefs and San Diego Chargers
 Johnny Manziel, Heisman Trophy recipient and former football quarterback for Texas A&M University, the Cleveland Browns, the Hamilton Tiger-Cats and Montreal Alouettes of the Canadian Football League, and the Memphis Express of the Alliance of American Football.
Howard Edward Butt, former CEO of H-E-B, a multimillion dollar grocery store in Texas
 John Teltschik, former football punter for the Philadelphia Eagles
 John Mahaffey, former professional golfer

References

External links
 

Public high schools in Texas
Schools in Kerr County, Texas